John Wilmot, 2nd Earl of Rochester (1647–1680) was an English libertine, friend of King Charles II, and writer of satirical and bawdy poetry.

John Wilmot may also refer to:
 Sir John Eardley Wilmot (1709–1792), Chief Justice of the Common Pleas 1766–1771
 John Wilmot (politician) (1748–1815), MP for Tiverton and later for Coventry
 Sir John Eardley-Wilmot, 1st Baronet (1783–1847), Governor of Tasmania, MP for Warwickshire North 1832–1843
 Sir John Eardley-Wilmot, 2nd Baronet (1810–1892), MP for Warwickshire South 1874–1885
 John Wilmot, 1st Baron Wilmot of Selmeston (1893–1964), British Labour Party MP and Minister of Supply
 John McNeil Wilmot (1755–1847), Canadian politician
 J. G. W. Wilmot (John George Winchester Wilmot, 1830–1895), coffee planter in Sri Lanka and surveyor in Victoria, Australia